Brosna is a small village and townland in County Offaly, Ireland. It lies in the valley of the Little Brosna River less than one kilometer off the N62 national secondary road. As of the 2011 census, Brosna townland had a population of 31 people. The area takes its named from the Little Brosna River, which flows through the townland.

Architecture
Brosna House, an early 19th-century two-storey house located at the roadside, is listed as being of architectural interest. A late 19th-century cast iron water pump also stands in the village.

Gloster House hotel and wedding venue is also located in the area.

See also
 List of towns and villages in Ireland

References

Towns and villages in County Offaly
Townlands of County Offaly